Saul Edward Phillips (born October 10, 1972) is an American college basketball coach. He is currently the head coach of the Northern State Wolves men's basketball team. Phillips is a graduate of University of Wisconsin–Platteville.

Coaching career

North Dakota State University
Phillips got his start at NDSU as an assistant coach under Tim Miles in 2004. When Miles left the school to coach Colorado State in 2007, Phillips was promoted to head coach.

In 2009 Phillips led the North Dakota State Bison to win the Summit League tournament championship and became the first team since Southwestern Louisiana (now Louisiana–Lafayette) in 1972 to advance to the NCAA Men's Division I Basketball Championship in their first year of eligibility. On January 17, 2013; Saul Phillips notched his 100th win with the Bison.

Phillips reached the NCAA tournament once again in 2014 after winning the Summit League tournament. Seeded 12th in the NCAA Tournament, the Bison upset 5th seeded Oklahoma in the second round 80–75, then lost to 4th seeded San Diego State 44-63 in the third round. He is currently 4th on the all-time wins list in NDSU men's basketball history.

Ohio University
On April 6, 2014, Phillips agreed to become the 18th head coach of the Ohio Bobcats. The 2014–15 Bobcats finished with a 10–20 overall record and only 5 wins in the MAC in spite of the presence of future NBA player Maurice Ndour. In 2015–16 the Bobcats went 23–12 and 11–7 MAC Conference record giving them the #2 seed in the 2016 MAC tournament. Junior Antonio Campbell was named the 2016 MAC Player of the Year after averaging a double-double throughout the season. The Bobcats lost to Buffalo in the semifinal game of the MAC Tournament 74–88. Ohio accepted an invitation to the 2016 College Basketball Invitational. They reached the semifinals but lost to Morehead State.  His 2016–17 went 20–10 overall and 11–7 in the MAC which was good for second place.

His last two seasons at Ohio were plagued by player injuries and resulted in 14-17 records both seasons. On March 13, 2019, Phillips' contract was not renewed by Ohio after 5 seasons.  One of his successes at Ohio turned out to be offering Jason Preston, who was unrecruited out of high school, a scholarship.  Preston was later selected in the 2021 NBA draft.

Northern State University
On June 11, 2019, Phillips was named the head men's basketball coach at Northern State following the departure of Paul Sather In his first season, the Wolves won the NSIC regular season championship and the NSIC tournament championship. However, the postseason was cancelled due to the COVID-19 pandemic.

Head coaching record

**-During the 2020-21 season, only a North and South Division winner were awarded, no overall conference championship was given due to COVID-19

House Hunters
Season 185, episode 7 of HGTV's show House Hunters featured Saul as he and his wife search for a home in Aberdeen, South Dakota.

References

External links
 Ohio profile
 North Dakota State profile

1972 births
Living people
American men's basketball coaches
American men's basketball players
Basketball coaches from Wisconsin
Basketball players from Wisconsin
College men's basketball head coaches in the United States
Lake Superior State Lakers men's basketball coaches
Milwaukee Panthers men's basketball coaches
North Dakota State Bison men's basketball coaches
Northern State Wolves men's basketball coaches
Ohio Bobcats men's basketball coaches
People from Reedsburg, Wisconsin
Wayne State Wildcats men's basketball coaches
Wisconsin–Platteville Pioneers men's basketball players